= New Zealand football team =

New Zealand football team may refer to national teams in the different varieties of football:

- New Zealand national football team, the association football team (soccer), nicknamed the All Whites.
- New Zealand national rugby league team, often nicknamed the Kiwis, administered by New Zealand Rugby League.
- New Zealand national rugby union team, better known as the All Blacks, administered by New Zealand Rugby.
  - New Zealand national rugby sevens team, All Blacks Sevens, compete in the World Sevens Series
